UHSS may refer to:

 Ultra high strength steel; see maraging steel
 Yuzhno-Sakhalinsk Airport